Backyard Football may refer to:

 Street football (American), a real-life game
 Backyard Football, an American football video game series
 Backyard Football (2002 video game), a GameCube game by Infogrames